Joaquín Barañao Díaz (Santiago, Chile, January 6, 1982) is a Chilean writer and podcaster, who specialized in books and podcasts about history. Specifically on freak fun facts about different topics.

Biography 

Barañao attended to Colegio San Ignacio El Bosque (1987–1999) and then civil engineering at Pontificia Universidad Católica de Chile (2000-2006), where he got a degree in hydraulic engineering.

Career 

His first job was as an advisor to Andrés Allamand, then senator of the XVI district (2006–2010). Then worked in the government of Sebastián Piñera, first in the President's cabinet and later in the cabinet of the undersecretary of the interior, Rodrigo Ubilla, coordinating the reform of the migratory legislation (2011–2014). He has provided advice on matters related to the Chile/Argentina 2030 Strategic Forum project.

Writer 
His first book started to take form in 2003, when he began compiling anecdotes and curious facts in a website. Only eleven years later, in December 2014, he published his first book on Amazon.com Historia universal freak (A Freak World History), which a year later was released in paperback by Planeta Group. The book narrates the history from the Big Bang to the present, through curious facts. The first volume remained 20 weeks in the El Mercurio non fiction bestselling list . A second volume of the work, was published in December 2016 and remained in the aforementioned list for seven weeks.

Historia freak del fútbol (A Freak History of Soccer) was released in May 2016, and appeared three weeks in the same ranking. In June 2017, that book was rewarded by the Instituto de Historia y Estadística del Fútbol Chileno as the best soccer book of the year.

In July 2017 was released Historia freak de la música (A Freak History of Music), point at which Barañao declared that his next projects were a book about the history of film for 2018, and then another one about the history of Chile. Historia Freak de la Música was in the bestselling list for two weeks.

Style 
Barañao concentrates long periods of time in middle-sized books, originating text of very high density of information and numerous curiosities, each of which is contains a bibliographic reference. The general tone is playful, ironic and irreverent, with continuous references to humour and sarcasm Barañao acknowledges in his work the influence of the writer Bill Bryson.

Bibliography 
 Historia universal freak, volume 1, Planeta Group, 2015; 
 Historia universal freak, volume 2, Planeta, 2016; 
 Historia freak del fútbol, Planeta, 2016; 
 Historia freak de la música, Planeta, 2017; 
 Historia freak del cine, volume 1, Planeta, 2018; 
 Historia freak del cine, volume 2, Planeta, 2018; 
 Historia freak de Chile, volume 1, Planeta, 2019; 
 Historia freak de Chile, volume 2, Planeta, 2020; 
¿Qué nos pasó Chile?; Ed. Trayecto, 2020 
Dinología Freak; Planeta, 2021;

References

External links 

Chat and coffee with Joaquín Barañao at "Hoy nos toca", Buenos Aires City Channel

People from Santiago
Chilean male writers
Pontifical Catholic University of Chile alumni
1982 births
Living people